Stade Malien is a Malian professional football and sports club based in Bamako. One of the two dominant clubs of Malian football, their eastern Bamako training grounds host other sports as well, including a successful basketball club.

Football club
Stade Malien de Bamako was founded in 1960 as a result of a fusion between Jeanne d'Arc and Espérance de Bamako.  Second only to Djoliba AC of Bamako in success, Stade Malien are their primary rivals. Stade plays its matches in the Stade 26 mars in the city centre, but is based in the eastern industrial outskirts of the city in the Sotuba neighborhood.  In 2006, it built a large training facility there, where a full stadium is being constructed. This is also the base for Stade Malien's youth and development clubs.  The U-17 in particular has been successful internationally, having competed in the Under 17 Club Championships in Spain in 2007.

Shield and colors
The emblem of the club is based on the city seal of Bamako, featuring three crocodiles. The team plays in white (from which it earns the nickname "les Blancs") and blue.

History
Stade Malien has inherited much of the history of Jeanne d'Arc du Soudan, founded in 1938 by two French-Africans and the missionary Révérend Père Bouvier. The name was borrowed from Jeanne d'Arc Dakar, and the white uniforms from the White Fathers, which Stade retain. JA du Soudan was one of the most successful clubs of the pre-independence period, winning the AOF Cup in 1953 and 1956 and reaching the finals in 1951 and 1959 (the last played). They reached the "coupe du Soudan" finals 6 times, winning four years (1950, 1951, 1952, 1955) and losing 2 (1947, 1948). Among their biggest rivals was "Africa Sport" of Bamako, who became Djoliba AC in 1960. JA's most famous players were Mamadou "Coulou" Coulibaly, Seydou Ndaw, Seydou Thiam, Cheick Oumar Diallo, Bacoroba "Baco" Touré, and Oumar Sy.

Espérance de Bamako was founded in 1958 as a student youth club, overseen by Fernand Diarra and captained by the young Bakary Samaké.

At independence, the two Bamako clubs fused, to become Stade Malian de Bamako in 1960. In the first Coupe du Mali, Stade and Djoliba reached the two match final in 1961. Tied 3–3 after the first match, Stade carried the cup 2–1 in the second.

Stade reached the first final of the African Cup of Champions Clubs in 1964–65. On 7 February 1965, Stade lost 2–1 to Oryx Douala played at Kumassi Ghana, but is remembered for the great play of star defender Souleymane "Solo" Coulibaly. Other famous early players for the Blancs were Yacouba Samabaly, Bakary Samaké, Sama Bass and Coach Oumar Sy. The great Salif Keita briefly appeared for the club.

During the 1968–91 military dictatorship of Moussa Traoré, many fans of Stade Malien felt that the government unfairly favored Djoliba AC. Heroes of this era include  Mamadou  Kéita "Capi",  Issa Yatassaye, Osumane Farota, Drissa Coulibaly, Abdoulaye Kaloga, Moussa "Gigla" Traoré.

Stade Malien participated in the 1970 cup final and won their third title after defeating Kayésienne (now part of AS Sigui) 10-0 and is the highest cup final result to date.

1990s – 2000s
Stade's fortunes have been mixed since then, but are always near the top of the Malian league.  The highpoints of the 1990s were their 1992 winning of the "Eyadéma Cup" in the UFOA Championship and their 1993–95 three-in-a-row league championships. The club enjoyed a spell of dominance under two periods under the management of Ghanaian football legend Karim Abdul Razak. He coached Stade for two seasons in the early 2000s, was lured back for a season to Asante Kotoko, and then returned for two more seasons to Bamako, fired by the Ghana side despite having brought them their first championship in ten years. During the 2000–01 season, Razak led Stade to not only a cup and league double, but guided the club to their first season ever unbeaten in every league and cup match.

Recent players of note have included Modibo Maïga (2000–04), Mohamed Kabore (2002) Boucader Diallo, Mohamed Djila, Bassala Toure, Djélimory Kané, Rafan Sidibé, Mohammed Muyei, and coach Karim Abdul Razak. Recent players capped to the Mali national football team include Lassine Diarra, Dramane Traoré (1999–01), Adama Diakité, Souleymane Dembele (2003–04) Harouna Diarra, Boucader Diallo, and Soumbeyla Diakité (2003–05).

Jeanne d'Arc FC
At the end of the 2006–07 season, a group of Stade supporters broke away to form their own football club, taking the "Jeanne d'Arc" name with them.  They formed Jeanne d'Arc FC, which competed in lower division football. In September 2008, Jeanne d'Arc became champions of the Groupe B league soccer tournament, one of two regional tournaments which promotes teams to the Malien Première Division, and will competed against their former counterparts during the 2008–09 season.

Malien Première Division 2007/08
Reigning champions from the 2007 Malien Première Division, Stade and rivals Djoliba sat atop the standings the entire season, with Djoliba leading in the run up to the final games. Their 7 July derby match was postponed to August, and although they beat their rivals, Stade finished the season 9 points behind champions Djoliba. The only other meeting between the two rivals in the season was in the Semi-finals of the Malien Cup, where Stade faced the humiliation of a 5–0 drubbing by Djoliba. Stade were eliminated from the CAF Champions League 2008 by Primeiro de Agosto of Angola in the early stages. In the league, their biggest win was a 5–0 defeat of USFAS Bamako on 14 July at home, with scorers Lassana Diallo, Karim Sogoba, Lassine Diarra, and Bakary Coulibaly scoring two.  In June, eight points behind the leaders, Stade replaced manager Cheick Diallo with Cheick Oumar Koné from Malian Army club Scorpions de Bamako. Despite winning eight of their nine last matches (they lost 1–0 away to JS Centre Salif Keita on 14 August), Djoliba handily took the cup and league double. While other reasons were given, the removal of the Club Director Mahamadou Samaké at the beginning of September, after eight years at the helm, was reported in the press as a result of this disappointing season. His resignation was subsequently withdrawn.

Bamako District Mayor's Cup
Stade's highpoint came at the end of the season, winning the "Coupe du Maire du District": the Bamako District Mayor's Cup. But while Stade made it to the final, its victory over arch-rival Djoliba came from legal, rather than on the field factors.  In the 44th minute of the match, Djoliba supporters rioted, attacking officials, other fans, and journalists.  The match was called off, and several days later, awarded to Stade.  Djoliba were fined 500,000 FCFA, all payments for previous matches were withdrawn, and they were excluded form the 2009 competition. Stade received the trophy and a 750,000 F Cfa award from the Mayor of Bamako Adama Sangaré on 23 September.

Earlier in the season, the club brought in two Burkinabé players, goalkeeper Rachid Abdoulaye Compaoré (to supplement national squad keeper Soumaila Diakité who was suspended from CAF play) and striker Moctar Ouédraogo (who has become a starter).  They said goodbye to defender Amadou "Docteur" Diallo  and longtime central defender and Captain Boucader Diallo.

2008/09 season
Stade Malien competed in 2008–09 Malian Première Division, beginning 12 December 2008. By the end of January 2009, with six matches played, Stade had slumped to one of their worst starts, winning only one match, and drawing only one. That draw came on the home leg of their derby match with Djoliba, holding them 1–1 with a 60-minute equaliser from Stade's Adama Touré.  They stood at 11th of 14 clubs in the standings. Following a particularly poor result, a group of Stade fans attacked the home of a mach official, and incurred a one million FCFA fine from FEMIFOOT. Standing just nine points off relegation on 10 February, the board sacked three players and manager Cheick Oumar Koné, replacing him with goalkeeping coach and former Malian international Yatouma Diop on an interim basis. On 12 February, the club's board announced Djibril Dramé, formerly of the Malian national team would become manager of the club.

The 2009 African Confederation Cup Winner
Stade Malien won the Confederation Cup for the year 2009 in a hard-fought battle against the Algerian giant Entente Sétif. Stade had initially suffered a 2–0 defeat to ES Sétif in the first leg of the cup's final, with its key players blaming the defeat on an unfriendly whether in Sétif. However, in the second leg, which was played on 5 December 2009 before 20–50.000 spectators at Modibo Keita Stadium in the Malian capital, the Bamako-based team stunningly overcame the Algerian side 3–2 on penalties after the regular 90 min. ended in favor of "Les Blancs" 2–0, which had tied the games of the two legs overall. This conclusive victory of Stade Malien was first of its kind in the history of Malian football as the country had never before won a real continental cup. Stade Malien and AS Real de Bamako as well as the country's national team, les Aigles du Mali, had been high value continental runners-up in the years of 1964, 1966, and 1972. But it is Stade Malien that finally received a continental trophy for the satisfaction of the Malian football fans.

Directorship
The club is a membership organisation, supported by subscription, with elected leadership. The organisation is advised by a General Assembly (L’assemblée générale du Stade malien) and run by an executive committee ("Le comité exécutif du Stade malien de Bamako") chosen by the Assembly. As the Assembly meets every few years, the business and supporters committees (comité de gestion and comité des supporters) elect directors (the supporters "central bureau" elect a president – Mamadou Diané in 2005) who, in the Assembly, choose an executive board. The president of the executive board runs the club.  The system is not without controversy, primarily over funds and choice of players. A previous manager claims he was removed when he did not make squad choices dictated by the executive board.

From 2000 Stade Malien's president has been Bamako businessman Mahamadou Samaké (known as "SAM"). In September 2006 Samaké was elected to his third consecutive three year mandate as president. In August 2008, he announced he was stepping down nominally to accept a promotion in his business work, it is rumored his resignation had more to do with more than a season of disappointing on field results. Within two weeks, Samaké's resignation was rescinded: Samaké announced he would finish his third three-year term as President of the club, scheduled to end in September 2009. Samaké is also Mali director for Randgold mining in Mali, and a former professor of Business law at the University of Bamako. Samaké succeeded Mamadou Samabaly in 2000. In 2008, the Executive Vice President of the club was Youssouf Coulibaly. In 2007, the board named three men Honorary Presidents for Life:  Dioncounda Samabaly, Mody Sylla, and Amadou Beydi Wane.

Recent history
Stade Malien would go on to win four straight titles.  In 2013, they finished with 79 points which became a club record and still stands into the present day. In 2015, they won their 20th champ title and became listed in the top 15 world clubs with the most championship titles.  Stade Malien, along with Djoliba, Real Bamako and Onze Createurs qualified into the final phase and won their 21st and fourth straight national championship with 14 points, double than second placed Djoliba and have a title less in its championship title totals in Mali, the club later qualified into the continental championships in the following season.

Another Super Cup successes were made in 2009 and 2010 as they got their doubles, the first qualified as a cup runner up as they Djoliba won both the championship and the cup title and the second as champion.  In 2011, Stade Malien walked out of the Malian super cup which they lost the title to Cercle Olympique (COB).  They came back to the 2013 Super Cup as champion and as the match ended in a scoreless draw, they lost the penalty shootouts do Djoliba 4–2.  In 2014, they got two straight Super Cup titles, first in 2014 where they qualified as champion and second was their triple title after winning 4–2 in penalties over Onze Créateurs as the match ended in a scoreless draw.

Stade Malien appeared in the 2017 CAF Champions League.  The club faced Liberia's BYC FC, they won the first leg but lost the second leg.  As each club had a goal draw, it went into penalty kicks and lost 6–7 to BYC FC.  The matches occurred before the Malian Football Federation was dissolved on 10 March due to increased funding from the country's sports ministry amidst a poor Malian economy and later the ban of Malian clubs' appearances at the continentals on 17 March.  In early May, all Malian competitions resumed after two months of suspension.  Their next match was a goal draw with Real Bamako.

Sponsors
Stade Malien the logo of sponsors Siemens during the 2007–08 seasons, with football kits manufactured by Adidas.  At the beginning of the 2007 season, Siemens signed a 50,000 Euro sponsorship deal with the club, and provided an estimated 20,000 Euros in additional services.  In August 2008, Stade Malian signed a deal with SOTELMA, the Malian State Telecommunications company, for two seasons at 20 million FCFA a season.

Honours
CAF Confederation Cup: 1
 2009

Malien Première Division: 23
 1970, 1972, 1984, 1987, 1989, 1993, 1994, 1995, 2000, 2001, 2002, 2003, 2005, 2006, 2007, 2010, 2011, 2013, 2014, 2015, 2016, 2020, 2021

 Malien Cup: 20
 1961, 1963, 1970, 1972, 1982, 1984, 1985, 1986, 1988, 1990, 1992, 1994, 1997, 1999, 2001, 2006, 2013, 2015, 2018, 2021.

 Super Coupe National du Mali: 10
 1998, 2000, 2001, 2005, 2006, 2007, 2009, 2010, 2014, 2015.

West African Club Championship (UFOA Cup): 1
 1992

French West African Cup: 2
 1953, 1956 (as Jeanne d'Arc)

League and cup history

Performance in CAF competitions

1 Invincible Eleven were ejected from the competition for fielding an ineligible player.
2 AS Douanes were ejected from the competition for fielding an ineligible player.

National level

Statistics
Best position: Finalist (Continental)
Best position at a cup competition: 1st, Champions (Continental)
Highest number of points in a season: 79, in 2013

Current squad

Managers

Basketball club
As with many West African clubs, Stade Malien fields teams in a number of sports, most notably their successful Men's and Women's Basketball teams.  Stade Malien men play in Division 1 in the 2008 season.  Historically, they have been Mali League Champion in 2003 and 2004 and were Mali Cup Finalist in 2003.

Other sports
Stade Malien de Bamako is an "Omnisports" club: as well as Football and Basketball, Stade Malien currently fields Athletics and Rugby teams, although the Rugby team remains unassociated with the National Federation.

References

 StadeMaliendeBamako.com: official site.
 Mali/Angola: Stade Malien de Bamako-Primoro de Agosto – 1–2. Les Echos (Bamako). 19 February 2008.
 AfricaBasket.com: MALIAN MEN BASKETBALL MAIN PAGE.	 	
 Super coupe, Stade-Djoliba 1–0 : les Blancs récidivent. S. B. TOUNKARA, l'Essor n°16096 du – 2007-12-14.
 Mali 2007/08 Championnat National Première Division
 Mali 2006/07 Championnat National Première Division Rec. Sport.Soccer Statistics Foundation, retrieved 2008-03-04. Rec. Sport.Soccer Statistics Foundation, retrieved 2008-03-04.
 Mali – List of Champions Rec. Sport.Soccer Statistics Foundation, retrieved 2008-03-04.
 Mali – List of Cup Winners Rec. Sport.Soccer Statistics Foundation, retrieved 2008-03-04.

External links
 Unofficial site
 AfricaBasket.com: MALIAN MEN BASKETBALL MAIN PAGE

 
1960 establishments in Mali
Association football clubs established in 1960
Football clubs in Mali
Basketball teams in Mali
Sport in Bamako
CAF Confederation Cup winning clubs